Fernando Peralta Carrasco (born 15 August 1961), known simply as Fernando, is a Spanish former footballer who played as a goalkeeper.

His career was mostly spent with Málaga and Sevilla, totalling 203 official games across two spells with the former. In all, he played 162 La Liga matches, also representing Compostela in the division.

Playing career

Club
Born in Ronda, Andalusia, Fernando began his career at nearby CD Málaga. He made his professional debut on 14 December 1980, coming on as a 53rd-minute substitute for José Luis Burgueña in a 2–1 Segunda División home win over neighbours Recreativo de Huelva. The following 8 February, he made his first start in a 1–0 win at Palencia CF; he totalled 17 appearances over the season whilst conceding 19 goals, adding one appearance the following campaign as the team won promotion.

Fernando made his La Liga debut on 4 September 1982, in a 1–1 home draw against Sporting de Gijón. He played all of the first seven games of the season, but only one more in its remainder; he then became an undisputed starter, missing only two league matches in the next three years combined, with the Blanquiazules being relegated in the second.

In 1986, Fernando returned to the top flight, signing for neighbours Sevilla FC. He played 38 games in his first season at the Ramón Sánchez Pizjuán Stadium to help to a final 12th place, being sent off towards the end of a 0–1 away loss to Real Valladolid on 2 November 1986; after the acquisition of Soviet Rinat Dasayev, he became a backup.

Fernando returned to Málaga in the 1990 offseason, being a starter during his two-year spell in the second level. On 31 March 1991, he received a red card in a 3–0 defeat at UD Las Palmas; he contributed with 28 appearances in 1991–92, but the side finished third from the bottom and folded soon after.

In 1992, Fernando left his native region for the first time, joining fellow league team CD Castellón on a two-year contract. He played consistently over three seasons, suffering another relegation in the second.

Fernando returned to the top division in the 1995 summer, at SD Compostela. All of his league appearances for the Galicians came during the 1996–97 campaign, and he was sent off late into his second in a 0–3 home loss to Valencia CF. On 12 October, in a 1–5 loss to FC Barcelona also at the Estadio Multiusos de San Lázaro, he conceded a famous goal from Ronaldo who had run from his own half; the Brazilian described it as the most beautiful of his career.

International
All categories comprised, Fernando won 11 caps for Spain at youth level. He represented the under-20 team at the 1981 FIFA World Youth Championship, starting in an eventual group stage exit.

Fernando made his debut for the under-21s on 6 June 1981, in a 0–0 draw against Colombia for the Toulon Tournament.

Post-playing career
After retiring, Fernando worked in coaching children around Málaga, in addition to work as a football analyst for Canal Sur and Diario Sur in the region.

Personal life
Fernando's younger brother, Luis, played as a defender in the 1991–92 Segunda División B for CD Fuengirola, suffering relegation.

References

External links

1961 births
Living people
People from Ronda
Sportspeople from the Province of Málaga
Spanish footballers
Footballers from Andalusia
Association football goalkeepers
La Liga players
Segunda División players
Segunda División B players
CD Málaga footballers
Sevilla FC players
CD Castellón footballers
SD Compostela footballers
Spain youth international footballers
Spain under-21 international footballers